Ork or ORK may refer to:
 Ork (folklore), a mountain demon of Tyrol folklore
 Ork (video game), a 1991 game for the Amiga and Atari ST systems
 Ork (Warhammer 40,000), a fictional species in the Warhammer 40,000 universe
 Ork!, a 2001 role-playing game
 Cork Airport in Ireland
 Orkney Islands
 Ork, a character in the book The Scarecrow of Oz by L. Frank Baum
 Ork, the home planet of the character Mork in the American television series Mork & Mindy
 An alternate spelling of orc, the name of a fantasy creature popularized by J. R. R. Tolkien

See also
90482 Orcus, Anti-Pluto, a trans-Neptunian object from the Kuiper belt with a large moon
Orc (disambiguation)